The Siamese partridge (Arborophila diversa) is a bird species in the family Phasianidae. It is found in highland forest in eastern Thailand. Some taxonomic authorities consider it to be a subspecies of the chestnut-headed partridge.

References

Siamese
Birds of Thailand
Siamese partridge
Siamese partridge